Jutland Glacier is a broad tributary glacier,  long and  wide, in the Victory Mountains of Victoria Land, Antarctica. It drains northwest from a common divide with Midway Glacier to join the flow of the Greenwell Glacier northwest of Boss Peak. It was mapped by the United States Geological Survey from surveys and U.S. Navy aerial photographs, 1960–63. It was named by the northern party of the New Zealand Federated Mountain Clubs Antarctic Expedition  (NZFMCAE) which explored the area in 1962–63, after the Battle of Jutland, to continue the sequence of features in the vicinity named after famous battles.

References

Glaciers of Victoria Land
Borchgrevink Coast